Mandelbach may refer to:

Mandelbach (Blies), a river of Saarland, Germany, tributary of the Blies
Mandelbach (Prüm), a river of Rhineland-Palatinate, Germany, tributary of the Prüm